Unsullied is a 2014 exploitation horror film directed by Simeon Rice and starring Murray Gray, Rusty Joiner, and James Gaudioso.

Premise
A female track star is kidnapped by two sociopaths when her car breaks down on a deserted road.

Cast
 Murray Gray as Reagan
 Rusty Joiner as Noah
 James Gaudioso as Mason
 Cindy Karr as Claudine
 Nicole Paris Williams as Kim
 Erin Boyes as Zoe
 Malone Thomas as Emerson
 Michelle Gracie as Mrs. Farrow

Reception
Unsullied received mixed reviews from critics.

References

External links
 
 Unsullied on Rotten Tomatoes

2014 films
2014 horror films
American films about revenge
2014 horror thriller films
2010s English-language films
2010s American films